Leszek Matela (born 15 April 1955) is a Polish journalist, a dowser, expert of feng shui and geomancy, teacher of suggestopedia, a researcher of the Wawel Chakra, and many Earth mysteries.

   
He is also the author of numerous books about radiesthesia, geomancy, parapsychology, runes, naturopathy and esoterics in Polish, Czech, and German. He is also known for television and radio shows devoted to radiesthesia and geomancy. He runs recognized courses of radiesthesia and geomancy and is considered to be an authority in these areas.
His articles were also published in Great Britain, USA and Australia.

Selected bibliography of books in Polish
   ABC wahadła, 1999,  (ABC of the Pendulum)
   ABC różdżki, 1999,  (ABC of the Dowsing Rod)
   ABC chromoterapii, 2000,  (ABC of the Chromotherapy)
   ABC feng shui, 2000,  (ABC of  Feng Shui)
   Polskie feng shui, 2001  (Polish Feng Shui)
   Oddziaływanie kształtów i symboli, 2002, (with co-author Otylia Sakowska)  (The Influence of the  Forms and Symbols)
   Tajemnice czakramu wawelskiego sekrety Krakowa, 2004  (Mysteries of the Wawel Chakra and Cracow)
   Runy dla Ciebie, 2003  (Runes for You)
   Tajemnice Słowian, 2005,  (Secrets of the Slavs)
   Jak korzystać z energii miejsc mocy?, 2008  (How Can We Use Energy of Places of Power?)
   Polska magiczna, 2009,  (Magic Poland)
   Pieczęć Wirakoczy i tajemnice Inków , 2012,  (Seal of Viracocha and Secrets of the Inca)

References

External links
 

1955 births
Living people
Dowsing
Polish journalists